A Moral Conjugal is a 2012 Portuguese drama film directed by Artur Serra Araújo and starring Dinarte Branco, São José Correia and José Wallenstein.

Cast
Dinarte Branco
São José Correia
José Wallenstein
Catarina Wallenstein
Maria João Bastos

Reception

Critical response
Jorge Mourinha, on Público, gave the film a rating of one out of five stars.

Accolades

References

External links

2012 films
2012 drama films
Portuguese drama films